Daylight Robbery is a 1964 British film from the Children's Film Foundation. Its plot concerns a group of kids who foil bank robbers.

Cast
Trudy Moors as Trudy
Janet Hannington as Janet
Kirk Martin as Kirk
Darryl Read as Darryl
Doug Robinson as Gangster (as Douglas Robinson)
John Trenaman as Gangster
Gordon Jackson as Sergeant
Janet Munro		
Zena Walker		
Patricia Burke		
James Villiers	
Norman Rossington		
Ronald Fraser

Critical reception
TV Guide called it an "Okay children's film with a surprisingly talented adult cast."

References

External links
 
 
 
 

1964 films
British children's films
Children's Film Foundation
1960s English-language films
Films directed by Michael Truman
1960s British films